"Here to Love" is a song recorded by American singer and songwriter Lenny Kravitz from his 11th studio album Raise Vibration. It was released as the album's fifth single on November 21, 2019. The music video for the song was directed by Mathieu Bitton.

Background
Kravitz partnered with the UN Human Rights Office to fight racism and to promote equality worldwide; "Here to Love" is used as the theme song to support the campaign #FightRacism in 2020 and beyond. The song markes Kravitz's directorial debut—he created the black-and-white video himself, showing various people of different races, genders, religions, backgrounds, who first stand alone and then united—as an illustration of human diversity. Kravitz also explained, "'The Here To Love' video is a procession of humanity, showing our beautiful differences while celebrating our oneness."

References

2019 singles
2018 songs
Lenny Kravitz songs
Songs written by Lenny Kravitz